NPI Media Group was a publishing group set up by UK publisher Alan Sutton.

The group's business was acquired by The History Press in 2007, amid a number of authors being owed royalty payments by the NPI Media Group.

The History Press, backed by NPI's private equity partner Octopus Investments, acquired all NPI's existing imprints (Pathfinder, Phillimore, Pitkin, Spellmount, Stadia, Sutton, Tempus and Nonsuch) together with all the existing titles, plus all the future contracts and the publishing rights contained in them.

Tony Morris, CEO of NPI Media became CEO of The History Press at the time of the acquisition. The History Press has since reorganised the group and grown to hold approximately 70% of the UK  market for local history publishing.

References

External links
 Official UK Website
 Society of Authors

Book publishing companies of the United Kingdom